Shim'a, also Yonadav, is an Israeli settlement in the West Bank, along the Green Line south of Livne and Teneh Omarim. Located on a hill 600 metres above sea level, it is organised as a community settlement and falls under the jurisdiction of Har Hevron Regional Council.

The international community considers Israeli settlements in the West Bank illegal under international law, but the Israeli government disputes this.

Name
Shim'a/Yonadav is named after King David's brother Shimeah and his son Jonadab.

History
The settlement was first established in 1982 as a pioneer Nahal military outpost, and demilitarized when turned over to residential purposes in 1988. As of 2015, Shim'a had approximately 600 residents.

References

External links
Shim'a  Amana
Shim'a Peace Now

Non-religious Israeli settlements
Populated places established in 1982
Nahal settlements
1982 establishments in the Palestinian territories
Community settlements
Israeli settlements in the West Bank